"Every Time" is a song by American singer Janet Jackson from her sixth studio album, The Velvet Rope (1997). It was released as the album's sixth and final single in November 1998. The song has been described as a ballad that lyrically delves into the protagonist's fear of love. Jackson only performed it on the last Japanese date of The Velvet Rope Tour in Tokyo.

Critical response
Billboard magazine's review was positive, stating, "'Every Time' ranks with [Jackson's] most memorable ballads, such as "Let's Wait Awhile" and "Again", calling on the things that make Janet so effective with this type of delicate material: Her voice quivers with emotion as she practically whispers about the promise and fear of an imminent romance, while steadfast writer/producer team Jimmy Jam and Terry Lewis wrap her vocal around a beautiful and sensuous chorus. This song sounds so perfect with the more civil pace of fall, it's an easy decision across the board, at top 40, AC, and R&B. Absolutely destined to be one of her greats." 

A reviewer from Birmingham Evening Mail wrote, "Gorgeous ballad featuring Miss Jackson's quivering vocals, a piano, strings and some understated percussion." J.D. Considine for Entertainment Weekly deemed it as one of the album's most affecting moments, noting "when the chords in the chorus to "Every Time" modulate into melancholy as Jackson observes that "every time I fall in love/It seems to never last"." Andrew Le from Renowned for Sound website, called the song "tender, angelic", and also commented that it was "far superior than the overrated, soppy saccharine Again, as it has an even better piano hook and more intimate vocal performance".

Chart performance
The single peaked at number fifty-two in Australia, number sixty-seven in Germany, and number ninety-five in France. But in Iceland it peaked at number 5. In the US it failed to chart on the Billboard Hot 100, but peaked at number twenty-five on the Bubbling Under Hot 100 Singles chart.

Music video
The accompanying music video was filmed in the then-new Therme Vals spa in Vals, Graubünden, in the Swiss Alps, with direction by Matthew Rolston in association with Howard Schatz, an expert in underwater photography. It was premiered on October 5, 1998, on HBO, and was subsequently exhibited twice a day leading up to the broadcast of the concert special for The Velvet Rope Tour one week later. The music video shows Jackson partially nude in water. A strong theme of green is seen in the video through lighting, the fabric surrounding Jackson's body and her contact lenses. The video was featured on the limited bonus-DVD edition of 2001's All for You as well as the 2004 DVD From Janet to Damita Jo: The Videos.

Britney Spears' "Everytime" has been compared to Jackson's video for "Every Time", with a critic noting, "The original pop queen Janet bared all in a blue lagoon for her "Every Time" video. A little less glam, Britney's tub scene in her "Everytime" video proved dark foreshadowing into her troubled world." Rihanna's "Stay" music video was also compared to both Spears and Jackson's "Everytime" videos, saying "Rihanna isn't the first pop star to brood in a bathtub. Janet Jackson and Britney Spears also bared their emotion immersed in water".

Track listings
 US promo CD single
 "Every Time" (album version) – 4:17
 "Every Time" (Call Out Hook) – 0:21

 UK CD single
 "Every Time" (album version) – 4:17
 "Every Time" (Jam & Lewis Disco Remix) – 4:10
 "Accept Me" – 4:07

 European 12-inch single
 "Every Time" (album version) – 4:17
 "Every Time" (Jam & Lewis Disco Remix) – 4:10
 "Every Time" (Jam & Lewis Disco Remix Instrumental) – 4:10

 Japanese CD single
 "Every Time" (album version) – 4:17
 "I Get Lonely" (Jason's Special Sauce Dub) – 6:44
 "I Get Lonely" (The Jason Nevins Radio Remix) – 3:13

Charts

Release history

References

1990s ballads
1997 songs
1998 singles
Janet Jackson songs
Music videos directed by Matthew Rolston
Pop ballads
Song recordings produced by Jimmy Jam and Terry Lewis
Songs written by Janet Jackson
Songs written by Jimmy Jam and Terry Lewis
Virgin Records singles